Onur Tukel (born August 5, 1972) is a Turkish-American actor, painter, and filmmaker.  A notable figure in the New York City independent film community, Tukel's films often deal with issues of gender and relationships.

Career
In 1997, Tukel wrote and directed his first feature film House of Pancakes.  His subsequent film, the vampire drama Drawing Blood, was completed in 1999.  In a 2014 interview with Entertainment Weekly, Tukel recalled that Drawing Blood was "the only time [he] made money on a movie."  His next film, the comedy drama Ding-a-ling-Less, was completed in 2001.  In 2005, Tukel (credited as Sergio Lapel) also wrote and directed the comedy The Pigs about a group of middle age men who arrange to have their wives murdered.

In 2012, Tukel wrote, produced, directed, and starred in the comedy drama film Richard's Wedding, which featured such other independent filmmakers as Josephine Decker, Lawrence Michael Levine, and Jennifer Prediger.  Despite an overall mixed critical response, the film was praised by David DeWitt of The New York Times as "a slice of the John Cassavetes, John Sayles and Richard Linklater life."

Tukel's next film, the 2014 vampire horror comedy Summer of Blood, received a warmer response from critics.  In a positive review of the film, Eric Kohn of Indiewire praised Tukel as possessing "contemptible goofiness" and being "the broke, post-9/11 version of an early Woody Allen character."  More recently, Tukel wrote, directed, and starred in the comedy/horror film Applesauce, which premiered at the Tribeca Film Festival on April 19, 2015.

As an actor, Tukel has also appeared in the 2011 film Septien, Alex Karpovsky's 2012 romantic comedy Red Flag, and Ping Pong Summer in 2014.

Filmography

References

External links

American male film actors
Living people
American people of Turkish descent
American film directors
1972 births
American male screenwriters
Film directors from North Carolina